Stabæk Fotball is a Norwegian professional football club based in Bærum, a suburb of Oslo. It is part of the multi-sport organization Stabæk IF. Founded in 1912, the club's name is an archaic spelling of the suburban area Stabekk, from which it once originated. The club currently competes in the Norwegian First Division, the second tier of Football in Norway. Their home stadium is the Nadderud Stadion after a three-year-long stay at the Telenor Arena. Their current chairman is Espen Moe. Lars Bohinen is the current head coach of the club since taking over on 18 August 2022.

History 
After years of lean seasons, they won their first title in 1998 as they emerged victorious in the Norwegian Cup, beating Rosenborg BK 3–1 in the final. After having been relegated to 1. divisjon after a poor 2004 season, they experienced a successful period under new manager Jan Jönsson, during which they returned to the league in 2005, won the 2008 Tippeligaen, their first, and reached the final of the Norwegian Cup, culminating in a very successful 2008 season for the club. Stabæk subsequently won the 2009 Norwegian Super Cup but finished a disappointing 12th and 10th place in the 2010 and 2011 league seasons, respectively, thus narrowly avoiding relegation both times.

Stabæk holds longstanding rivalries with Bærum SK, FK Lyn and Vålerenga, both in the league and by geographical location. The team’s home colors, entirely blue, have earned them the nickname “De Blaa” (The Blue Ones). In 2009, Stabæk became the first Norwegian association football club with both their men's and women’s teams in the premier divisions. Lillestrøm followed suit the next year.

On 30 November 2015, Billy McKinlay was appointed as manager of the club on a two-year contract. McKinlay resigned as manager on 8 July 2016, after being knocked out of the UEFA Europa League by Welsh club Connah's Quay Nomads.

In the 2021 Eliteserien season, Stabæk finished in 15th place, resulting in relegation to the Norwegian First Division for the first time since 2012.

Stadium 

Stabæk played home games at the Nadderud Stadion until 2008. They then moved into the Telenor Arena, which had a capacity of 15,000 people. Their stay at the Telenor Arena became shorter than desired; after a three year-long stay at the indoor arena, they moved back to the Nadderud Stadion due to economic issues with the new arena.  The women's team, Stabæk FK, also currently plays home games at Nadderud Stadion. Nadderud Stadion has a capacity of 4,938 spectators.

The club's record home attendance was set on 13 September 2009, when 13,402 spectators attended Telenor Arena to watch a game against Rosenborg BK. The record attendance at Nadderud Stadion of approximately 10,000 spectators dates from the quarter-final of the 1970 Norwegian Cup, a game Stabæk lost 2–4 against Strømsgodset.

Chairman 
On 4 February 2010, Einar Schultz was elected chairman of Stabæk, replacing Ingebrigt Steen Jensen. Schultz has held various positions in the Stabæk system over the last five years. In February 2012, Kjell Johnsen was elected the new chairman of Stabæk Fotball. Johnsen was replaced in 2013 by Espen Moe.

European record

Honours 
Tippeligaen
Champions: 2008
Runners-up: 2007
Third place: 1998, 2003, 2009, 2015
Norwegian Football Cup
Champions: 1998
Runners-up: 2008
Superfinalen
Champions: 2009

Recent history

Records 

Greatest home victory: 8–0 vs. Molde FK, 29 October 2006
Greatest away victory: 14–0 vs. Vestfossen IF, 12 May 2008
Heaviest home loss: 0–7 vs. Lillestrøm SK, 20 March 2011
Heaviest away loss: 1–8 vs. SK Brann, 24 May 2001
Highest attendance, Telenor Arena: 13 402 vs. Rosenborg BK, 13 September 2009
Highest average attendance, season: 9,472, 2009
Most appearances, total: 365,  Morten Skjønsberg (2001–2011, 2014–2017)
Most appearances, league: 320,  Morten Skjønsberg (2001–2011, 2014–2017)
Most goals scored, total: 111,  Daniel Nannskog (2005–2009)
Most goals scored, league: 101,  Daniel Nannskog (2005–2010)
Most goals scored, Eliteserien: 62,  Daniel Nannskog (2006–2009)
Most goals scored, season: 32,  Daniel Nannskog (2005)
Most goals scored, Eliteserien, season: 19,  Petter Belsvik (1998),  Daniel Nannskog (2006; 2007)

Current players

Managers

Women's team 

Stabæk Fotball also fields a women's team. In 2009, Stabæk became the first Norwegian association football club with both their men's and women’s teams in the premier divisions.

References

External links 
 Official website
 Supporter pages (Stabæk Support)

 
Association football clubs established in 1912
1912 establishments in Norway
Football clubs in Norway
Eliteserien clubs